is a Japan-exclusive side-scrolling platform game for the Super Famicom published by Bandai in 1994. The game is an adaptation of the manga series Gon by Masashi Tanaka, about the daily life of a super-deformed orange Giganotosaurus dinosaur named Gon.

Plot 
Like the manga, the game has minimal plot and no dialogue. It advances the story using comics-style cutscenes with a focus on comic situations Gon gets himself into searching for food, interacting with other animals, or venturing into different ecosystems that made up the prehistoric world.

Gameplay 

Enemies include monkeys, warthogs, polar bears, rhinoceroses, ibex, and bobcats. Sharks and orcas have the special ability to swallow Gon whole, but he can break free in most instances. There are Mode 7 chase sequences between levels, in which Gon must avoid obstacles while catching up to a monkey. A 4-digit password is seen at the end of each level. 

Gon has three attacks: a basic self-defense biting attack, a whip of his tail, and a headbutt. The game lacks a HUD-style health bar. Instead, taking damage from enemies results in Gon getting more frustrated (a music will play if he is almost fully frustrated). If he is angered enough, he will destroy the planet, leading to a game over screen. Sound effects are based on music instrumentals and vice versa.

Legacy
Gon would later go on to play a role in the Sony PlayStation fighting game Tekken 3 in 1998. A new platform game, Gon: Baku Baku Baku Baku Adventure, developed for the Nintendo 3DS, was released in Japan on June 14, 2012 by Bandai Namco Games. A new mobile game GON: Match 3 puzzle was released in 2013 by Lunosoft Inc. for iOS and Android.

External links 
Gon at Video Game Den
Gon at GameFAQs
 Gon character sprites  at The Shyguy Kingdom
 Gon at Super-Famicom.jp

Gon (manga)
1994 video games
Bandai games
Dinosaurs in video games
Japan-exclusive video games
Platform games
Side-scrolling video games
Super Nintendo Entertainment System games
Super Nintendo Entertainment System-only games
Video games based on anime and manga
Video games developed in Japan
Video games set in prehistory